Stephen B. Dunn (December 21, 1858 – May 5, 1933) was a Major League Baseball first baseman in the 19th century.  He played for the St. Paul Saints of the Union Association, a replacement team which began major league play near the end of the 1884 season.
  
In 9 games as the Saints' starting first baseman Dunn batted .250 (8-for-32) with two runs scored.  He fielded well at first base (.972) and also played part of one game at third base.

A native of London, Ontario, Canada, he died in his hometown at the age of 74.

External links
Baseball Reference

1858 births
1933 deaths
19th-century baseball players
Albany Governors players
Baseball people from Ontario
Buffalo Bisons (minor league) players
Canadian expatriate baseball players in the United States
Major League Baseball first basemen
Major League Baseball players from Canada
St. Paul Saints (UA) players
Sportspeople from London, Ontario
Stillwater (minor league baseball) players
Milwaukee Brewers (minor league) players
London Cockneys players
Meriden Silvermen players
Lynn Lions players
Rochester Maroons players
Utica Pent Ups players
Greenville (minor league baseball) players